Artemis Pebdani (born August 2, 1977) is an American actress, best known for her roles as Susan Ross on Scandal, Artemis on It's Always Sunny in Philadelphia and Gramma Alice on Big City Greens.

Early life
Pebdani was born and raised in Texas. Her parents were Iranians who left Iran in the mid-1970s, five years before the Islamic Revolution. She received her BFA in theatre from Southern Methodist University and is also an alum of the Dell'Arte International School of Physical Theatre in Blue Lake, California.

Career
In the early 2000s, Pebdani began appearing on television shows such as The Shield, Ugly Betty, and House. From 2005 onwards, she has had the recurring role of Artemis, the foul-mouthed friend of Sweet Dee, in the FX comedy series It's Always Sunny in Philadelphia.

Pebdani has had guest starring roles on How I Met Your Mother, Modern Family, Raising Hope, Garfunkel and Oates, Brooklyn Nine-Nine, Hot in Cleveland, and House of Lies. Her breakthrough role came in 2014, playing the role of Flo Packer in the second season on the Showtime period drama Masters of Sex. Her character is the owner of a diet pill company for which Virginia Johnson works as a salesperson for part of the season. Then she becomes involved in a table-turning sexual relationship. In 2015, Pebdani joined the cast of Shonda Rhimes's political drama Scandal as Susan Ross, the new Vice President of the United States. In 2016, she joined the cast of the Fox comedy Son of Zorn as Linda Orvend (Zorn's boss). In 2018, Pebdani had a voice role on the Disney animated series Big City Greens. She appeared on Disney's Godmothered.

She played the wallflower in the New Kids on The Block's video "Remix (I Like The)" released in 2013.

Filmography

Film

Television

Video games

References

External links
 
 
 
 
 Artemis Pebdani on BuddyTV

1977 births
Living people
American people of Iranian descent
21st-century American actresses
Southern Methodist University alumni
American television actresses
Actresses from Texas